Hans Johann Georg Lubinus (25 December 1893 – 3 July 1973) was a German sailor. He competed in the mixed 6 metres at the 1936 Summer Olympics and the mixed 5.5 metres at the 1952 and 1956 Summer Olympics.

Personal life
Lubinus served in the German Army during the First World War, and was awarded the Iron Cross First and Second Class. In this function, he was involved in compulsory sterilisation.

References

1893 births
1973 deaths
Sportspeople from Kiel
Olympic sailors of Germany
Sailors at the 1936 Summer Olympics – 6 Metre
Sailors at the 1952 Summer Olympics – 5.5 Metre
Sailors at the 1956 Summer Olympics – 5.5 Metre
Recipients of the Iron Cross (1914), 1st class
Recipients of the Iron Cross (1914), 2nd class
Kriegsmarine personnel of World War II
German surgeons
Nazi war criminals
German male sailors (sport)
20th-century surgeons